John T. Rawls (July 5, 1903 - November 20, 1962) served in the California State Assembly for the 68th district from 1933 to 1935 and during World War I he served in the United States Army.

References

United States Army personnel of World War I
20th-century American politicians
Democratic Party members of the California State Assembly
1903 births
1962 deaths